The Czechoslovakia men's national softball team made only one international appearance, in the 1992 World Championships in Manila. It had a record of 1-7 in the preliminary round-robin round and did not advance.

References

Men's national softball teams
National sports teams of Czechoslovakia
Men's sport in Czechoslovakia
Softball in Czechoslovakia